The United Socialist Party of Venezuela (PSUV) is a left-wing to far-left socialist political party which has been the ruling party of Venezuela since 2010. It was formed from a merger of some of the political and social forces that support the Bolivarian Revolution led by President Hugo Chávez.

At the 2015 parliamentary election, PSUV lost its majority in the National Assembly for the first time since the unicameral legislature's creation in 2000 against the Democratic Unity Roundtable, winning 55 out of the National Assembly's 167 seats. In the 2020 elections however, amid a widespread opposition boycott, they won back a supermajority of the chamber.

History
The process of merging most of the unidentified parties involved in the pro-Bolivarian Revolution coalition was initiated by Venezuelan president Hugo Chávez after he won the Venezuelan presidential election of 2006. The process was led by Chávez' own party, the Fifth Republic Movement, and was supported by a range of smaller parties such as the People's Electoral Movement (MEP), Venezuelan Popular Unity (UPV), the Tupamaro Movement, the Socialist League and others which all together added up 45.99% of the votes received by Chávez during the 2006 election. Other pro-Bolivarian parties like the Communist Party of Venezuela (Partido Comunista de Venezuela, PCV), Fatherland for All (Patria Para Todos, PPT) and For Social Democracy (PODEMOS), that cast 14.60% of the votes from that election, declined to join the new party.

On 7 March 2007, Chávez presented a phased plan for founding the new party until November 2007. PODEMOS, PPT and PCV initially stated they would wait until PSUV had been founded and decide their membership in the new party based on its program. On 18 March 2007, Chávez declared on his programme Aló Presidente that he had "opened the doors for the For Social Democracy, the Fatherland for All, and the Communist Party of Venezuela if they want to go away from Chávez´s alliance, they may do so and leave us in peace". In his opinion, those parties were near to be on the opposition and they should choose wisely, between going "in silence, hugging us or throwing stones". PPT, at its 2007 congress on 10 and 11 April, decided not to join but re-affirmed its support for Chávez and the Bolivarian Revolution.

The party held its founding congress in early 2008, from 12 January to 2 March, with 1681 delegates participating. Chávez was proclaimed President of the new party on 14 March.

As of 2014, the party has been described as "fracturing" and "weakening" due to the loss of Hugo Chávez, the poor state of Venezuela's economy and falling oil prices. Internal issues also appeared in the party, with an email address and telephone hotline created to report "internal enemies". In 23 November PSUV elections, it was reported by party dissidents that very few individuals participated, with less than 10% of the supposedly 7.6 million members casting a vote.

Overview
The PSUV defines its values and principles as follows:

The PSUV defend the Bolivarian Revolution as a process of peaceful transition to socialism and, therefore, of overcoming capitalism. This is in line with Chávez's socialism of the 21st century. The party considers the establishment of socialism to be necessarily linked to an anti-imperialist struggle, that, currently, must consist of the formation of a block of socialist countries in Latin America.

With the creation of PSUV, relationships greatly soured with former coalition parties that chose not to join. By the 2008 regional election campaign in October, Chávez declared that "Patria Para Todos and the Communist Party of Venezuela will disappear from the political map because they are liars and manipulators."

Chávez said that the PSUV was "a very young party" with an average age of 35 among members. Analysts agreed, saying: "The assumption is that the younger people are going to be [Chavistas], they are going to be the ones whose families have benefited from Chávez's social programs."

In April 2010, an Extraordinary Congress of the PSUV resulted in the endorsement of a range of "general principles", including among others socialism, Marxism, and Bolivarianism; humanism, internationalism, and patriotism; and the defense of participatory democracy and use of internal party democracy. It also defined the party as the "political vanguard of the revolutionary process".

The party held its 3rd Congress in 2014, which elected Nicolás Maduro as the 2nd party president and honored Hugo Chávez posthumously as the party's eternal president and founder, and party policies were updated. It was followed by the 4th Party Congress in 2018.

Symbolism
The Party builds on the cult of personality of Hugo Chávez, with revolutionary symbols like the Chávez eyes sometimes along with the party symbols.

Party symbols

Structure

Party Congress
The highest level of organization is the National Party Congress, which is the party's supreme organ, and is held upon the discretion of the National Board whenever necessary. It is composed of elected delegates both from the national level and state representatives of party committees, and is empowered to:
nominate the President of the Party and his/her Vice President
elect new or returning members of the National Board, National Political Bureau, and departments of the National Board
amend the Party Charter and Rules
discuss and enact any new party policies, as well as to amend existing ones

The National Party Congress is held every four years.

National Board
The party is headed at the national level by the Eternal President Hugo Chávez (a posthumous title), the president (currently Nicolás Maduro), vice-president (Diosdado Cabello), and the national board of directors currently made up of the following:
Adán Chávez
Alí Rodríguez Araque
Ana Elisa Osorio
Aristóbulo Istúriz
Darío Vivas
Cilia Flores
Elías Jaua
Erika Farías
Freddy Bernal
Héctor Rodríguez
Jacqueline Faría
Jorge Rodríguez

María Cristina Iglesias

Nicolás Maduro

Rafael Ramírez
Rafael Gil Barrios
Ramón Rodríguez Chacín
Rodrigo Cabezas
Tareck El Aissami
Vanessa Davies

The PSUV National Board is the highest organ of party leadership and is empowered by the Charter to enact new policies in between Party Congresses.

Units of Battle Hugo Chávez (UBCh)

The Units of Battle Hugo Chávez (UBCh) is a collection of organizations with multiple members of PSUV involved that has both military and political characteristics. The UBCh originated as a group to defend the Bolivarian Revolution and support the party through electoral processes in Venezuela, and were transformed into their current name in 2013. They form the basic party unit in Venezuelan communities, and four or more of them form a People's Struggle Circle (Círculo de Lucha Popular) in the community level. The Unit itself is divided into ten Unit Patrols serving various functions for party members in various sectors.

Other assisting groups include:
PSUV National Political Bureau
PSUV Regional Departments, led by Regional Vice Presidents
PSUV Sectors Organizations, led by Sectoral Vice Presidents
United Socialist Party of Venezuela Youth

Election results

Presidential

Parliamentary

See also

 Revolutionary Marxist Current

References

External links

 
2007 establishments in Venezuela
History of socialism
Hugo Chávez
Left-wing parties in South America
Left-wing populism in South America
Political parties established in 2007
Political parties in Venezuela
Far-left political parties in Venezuela
Socialist parties